Antonio Vázquez may refer to:
 Antonio Vázquez de Espinosa (died 1630), Spanish monk
 Antonio Vázquez (sport shooter) (1860 – after 1920), Spanish sport shooter and Olympic competitor
 Antonio Vázquez (archer) (born 1961), Spanish archer and Olympic gold medalist
 Antonio Jesús Vázquez Muñoz or Jesús Vázquez (born 1980), Spanish football player
 Antonio Vázquez (weightlifter) (born 1993), weightlifter who represented Mexico at the 2015 Pan American Games